Dactyloceras ocelligera is a moth in the family Brahmaeidae. It was described by Arthur Gardiner Butler in 1889. It is found in Kenya.

References

Arctiidae genus list at Butterflies and Moths of the World of the Natural History Museum

Endemic moths of Kenya
Brahmaeidae
Moths described in 1889